Clash of the Codes was a New Zealand television programme which aired in 1993 and again in 1996. It pitted athletes from different sports codes against each other as teams in a series of physical challenges.

Hosts
Simon Barnett (1994)
Robert Rakete (1997)

Sports Stars
Ian Ferguson: Ian was already well known as a Gold-winning Olympian but also became well known to the New Zealand public for his sporting skills in Clash of the Codes twice being in the winning team.
Steve Gurney: Steve Gurney is a New Zealand multisport and triathlon athlete famous for winning the "Coast to Coast" event a record 9 times.

New Zealand reality television series